Padua Sufia Rahman High School is a secondary school in Chauddagram, Comilla District, Bangladesh.

References

High schools in Bangladesh
Schools in Comilla District